Nagayoshi Dam  is a rockfill dam located in Kagoshima Prefecture in Japan. The dam is used for flood control and irrigation. The catchment area of the dam is 8 km2. The dam impounds about 9  ha of land when full and can store 1174 thousand cubic meters of water. The construction of the dam was started on 1970 and completed in 1979.

See also
List of dams in Japan

References

Dams in Kagoshima Prefecture